Safira Ika Putri Kartini Ardiansyah (born 21 April 2003) is an Indonesian footballer who plays a defender for Persis Putri and the Indonesia women's national team.

Club career

Arema
Safira signed for Liga 1 Putri club Arema Putri in November 2020. At Arema, she was the team captain and attracted a lot of attention. She reached Pertiwi Cup 3rd place and several unofficial titles when playing for the team.

Persis
In mid 2022, Persis Solo founded their women's team. Safira was among the first players the team announced in late April 2022, before their inaugural season.

International career 
Safira represented Indonesia at the 2022 AFC Women's Asian Cup qualification.

Safira was chosen as the captain for the nation team at the 2022 AFF Women's Championship.

Honours

Club
Arema
 Pertiwi Cup 3rd place: 2021–22

References

External links

2003 births
Living people
Sportspeople from Surabaya
Indonesian women's footballers
Women's association football defenders
Indonesia women's youth international footballers
Indonesia women's international footballers
21st-century Indonesian women